This is a list of mountains in Australia.

Highest points by state and territory

List of mountains in Australia by topographic prominence

This is a list of the top 50 mountains in Australia ranked by topographic prominence. Most of these peaks are the highest point in their areas.

Australian Capital Territory

The following is a list of mountains and prominent hills in the Australian Capital Territory in order, from the highest peak to the lowest peak, for those mountains and hills with an elevation above  :

New South Wales

Queensland

South Australia

Tasmania

Victoria

Western Australia 
 Carnarvon Range
 Mount Augustus (1105m)
 Mount Beadell
 Darling Range
 Mount Dale
 Mount Cooke
 Hamersley Range
 Mount Meharry (at 1,249 metres above sea level, the highest peak in Western Australia)
 Mount Bruce (1,221 m; the second highest peak in WA)
 Mount Nameless/Jarndunmunha 1,115 m
 Wunaamin Miliwundi Ranges, formerly King Leopold Ranges
 Mount Lesueur
 Porongurup Range
 Stirling Range
 Bluff Knoll (1,099m)
 Toolbrunup (998m)
 Mount Magog
 Mount Trio
 Mount Hassell
 Talyuberlup Peak
 Peak Charles National Park
 Peak Charles
 Peak Eleanora
 West Mount Barren
 East Mount Barren
 Mount Wells (983m)
 Mount Ord (947m)
 Mount Teague
 Mount Manypeaks

Northern Territory

References

Australia
Mountains
Aus